Gustav Fredrik Lorentzen (13 January 1915 – 7 August 1995) was a thermodynamic scientist from Norway. 
Gustav Lorentzen was a professor at Norwegian Institute of Technology, and Norwegian University of Science and Technology. In the late 1980s, Gustav Lorentzen rediscovered how CO2 could be used as a refrigerant in heating and cooling applications. He developed the modern thermodynamic transcritical cycle in 1988–1991.
In 1988 Lorentzen designed a concept for a new, but simple and efficient way of regulating CO2 systems. This idea became the turning point in the re-invention of CO2 cooling technology. Meanwhile, the Japanese corporation Denso had familiarized itself with Lorentzen's dissertation in 1993, and was evaluating the concept as a basis for a new air-condition application in cars. A series of communications between Lorentzen and Denso followed and the result of the collaboration between Lorentzen and Denso was a fundamental step in the innovation of EcoCute which was commercialized in 2000s.

See also 
 Transcritical cycle
 SINTEF
 EcoCute

References

External links 
 7th IIR Gustav Lorentzen Conference on Natural Working Fluids, May 28 to 31st 2006, Trondheim, Norway
 IIR Gustav Lorentzen Conference on Natural Working Fluids
 IIR Gustav Lorentzen Conference on Natural Working Fluids

1915 births
1995 deaths
20th-century Norwegian scientists